The National Museum of Art is an art museum in central Port-au-Prince, Haiti.
The museum contains pre-Columbian works of art from all over the country.

See also 

 Musée du Panthéon National Haïtien
 National Museum of Haiti

References 

Art museums and galleries in Haiti
Buildings and structures in Port-au-Prince
Haiti, Art